Cyphomella is a genus of non-biting midges in the subfamily Chironominae of the bloodworm family Chironomidae.

Species
C. argentea (Townes, 1945)
C. cornea Sæther, 1977
C. gibbera Sæther, 1977
C. grisa (Malloch, 1915)

Chironomidae